, commonly known as  or also Japan FA Cup, is a Japanese football competition. It has the longest tradition of any football match in Japan, dating back to 1921, before the formation of the J.League, Japan Football League and their predecessor, Japan Soccer League.

Before World War II, teams could qualify not only from Japan proper but also from Empire of Japan's former-colonies such as Korea, Taiwan, and sometimes Manchukuo. The winning club qualifies for the AFC Champions League and the Japanese Super Cup. The women's equivalent to this tournament is the Empress's Cup.

Ventforet Kofu is the current winners, having won its first title in the 2022 final.

Overview
As it is a competition to decide the "best soccer club in Japan", the cup is now open to every member club of the Japan Football Association, from J1 and J2 (J.League Divisions 1 and 2) down to teams from J3 (J3 League), JFL, regional leagues, and top college and high school teams from around the country. The Emperor's Cup is one of two well-known national football tournaments named after a monarch (the other is Spain's Copa del Rey).

The holder can wear a Yatagarasu emblem (the ordinary winner wears one, the E letter and the purple line above the bird, the league-cup double winner can wear the gold star and line above the Yatagarasu) and obtains an AFC Champions League spot for the next season.

Since the creation of the J.League in 1992, the professional teams have dominated the competition, although doubles, once common in the JSL, have become very rare. However, because the Emperor's Cup is contested in a knockout tournament format, the opportunity for "giant-killers" from the amateur ranks upsetting a top J.League squad is a very real possibility. For example, a major upset almost occurred in the 2003/04 competition, when Funabashi Municipal High School took the 2003 J.League champion Yokohama F. Marinos to a penalty shootout. Although Waseda University was the last non-league winner in 1966, and the previous non-top tier winner was in 2011 (contested by two second-tier teams, FC Tokyo and Kyoto Sanga, with FC Tokyo winning 4–2).

Since 1969, the Emperor's Cup final had traditionally been played on New Year's Day of the following year at the National Stadium in Tokyo and is regarded as the traditional closing match of the season. Since 2014, the venue has varied due to the stadium's renovation for the 2020 Summer Olympics. The 2014 Emperor's Cup Final was not held on New Year's Day, but 13 December 2014, due to the Japan's qualification to the 2015 AFC Asian Cup. The 2018 final was held on 9 December 2018. Although an official reason has not been given, it was suspected due to the national team's involvement in 2019 AFC Asian Cup.

On 1 January 2020, first time finalist Vissel Kobe beat Kashima Antlers in the 2019 Emperor's Cup Final at the recently built new National Stadium to win the first title in their 54-year club history. This was the first professional match in Japan video assistant referee (VAR) being used.

Format
The first matches to qualify for the Emperor's cup begin anywhere from April to August of that year, and varies year to year.  For the 97th Emperor's Cup (2017), the games were played from 22 April 2017 and ended with the final on 1 January 2018. 
The knockout phase of the competition begins towards the end of the year. This phase is composed of all teams from J1 League (J1) and J2, the winners from each of the 47 prefectural championships (consist of amateur teams ranging from J3 League to college teams), and 1 organizer-nominated team among all amateur teams (this was assigned to the collegiate champion until 2011).

J1 teams, and sometimes J2 team(s) also receive bye(s) in the knockout phase. In 2016, all J1 teams and the previous year's J2 champions received a bye, and AFC Champions League participants received 3 byes. In 2017, all J1 and J2 teams received a bye.  However, they lose home advantage starting from the third round, unless they are facing a higher-tier or higher ranked team.

From 1965 to 1971, the top 4 JSL clubs at the end of the season qualified for the Cup and the other four spaces allotted were taken by finalists from universities. From 1972 to 1995, as the League increased in size, the entire top division teams were entered automatically, while the second tier's member clubs participated in regional stages with other clubs. Beginning in 1996, the second-tier clubs (at the time, the old Japan Football League) began to be admitted automatically instead of having to play regional stages, which in turn became prefectural stages.

Before 2008, 48 teams took part in the first two rounds – the winner from each of the 47 prefectural championships and the collegiate champion. The top team in the JFL standings and all thirteen J2 teams joined in the third round. Finally, the eighteen J1 teams joined in the fourth round, making a total of 80 participating teams.

Trophy

The original All Japan Championship Tournament trophy was awarded to the JFA by the English Football Association in 1919. This trophy was used until January 1945, when the militarist government confiscated it and melted down to procure additional metal for the war effort. When the tournament was reinstated, the present trophy, showing the Imperial chrysanthemum seal began to be awarded.

In August 2011, the English FA presented its Japanese counterpart with a replica of the original trophy, made by London silversmiths Thomas Lyte. JFA President Junji Ogura expressed hope that the trophy, to be awarded at the 2011 final, would be "a symbol of peace".

Qualification to AFC Champions League

The cup winner qualifies for the AFC Champions League (ACL) since the 2001 tournament, where Shimizu S-Pulse qualified for the ACL 2002–03. Before the establishment of ACL, the cup winner qualified for the Asian Cup Winners' Cup. From 2012, as a part of the requirement of AFC, the champion team must also hold a J1 Club License in order to enter the ACL (but not necessary to be a Division 1 team).

From the 2002–03 to 2008 ACL editions, the cup winner participated in the ACL that began one year later; for example, the Emperor's Cup winner for the 2005 season (crowned on 1 January 2006) participated in the 2007 tournament. In November 2007, the JFA announced that the 2009 ACL spot would be given to the 2008 season's winner (crowned on 1 January 2009), not the 2007 winner. As a result, the 2007 winner, Kashima Antlers, did not earn the 2009 ACL spot through the championship. (Nevertheless, Antlers eventually earned the 2009 ACL spot by winning the 2008 J.League Division 1.)

If the cup winner has already earned an AFC Champions League spot through finishing above third in J1 League, the last spot will be given to J1's fourth-placed team.

List of Emperor's Cup finals
Teams in bold indicate doubles with the league title, while teams in italics indicate non-top flight clubs (both after 1965).

Performances

All-time 
 University club's performance separated as follows: Players are enrolled students / Players are enrolled students and graduates.

J.League era (1992–present)

Other Emperor's Cups
The Emperor's Cup term is used for many national championships in other sports, including judo (the All-Japan Judo Championships) and volleyball (Emperor's Cup and Empress's Cup All Japan Volleyball Championship). The Emperor's Cup (天皇賜杯, Tennō shihai) is awarded to the top division yūshō winner of a sumo tournament.

See also

 Football in Japan
 Japan Football Association (JFA)
 Japanese association football league system
 League system
 J.League
 J1 League
 J2 League
 J3 League
 Japan Football League (JFL) (IV)
 Japan Regional Football Champions League (Promotion Play-offs to JFL)
 Japanese Regional Leagues (V/VI)
 Fujifilm Super Cup (Super Cup)
 J.League YBC Levain Cup (League Cup)
 Empress's Cup

References

External links

 Official website, JFA.jp 
 RSSSF.com - Japan - List of Emperor's Cup Finals

 
Football cup competitions in Japan
Japan
Recurring sporting events established in 1921
1921 establishments in Japan